Jeffrey Perkins is an American sound engineer. He won an Academy Award for Best Sound for the film Dances with Wolves. He has worked on more than 120 films since 1984.

Selected filmography
 Dances with Wolves (1990)
 FernGully: The Last Rainforest (1992)
 The Santa Clause (1994)
 Gordy (1995)
 See Spot Run (2001)

References

External links

Year of birth missing (living people)
Living people
American audio engineers
Best Sound Mixing Academy Award winners
Place of birth missing (living people)